Hapalopus coloratus is a species of tarantula found in Panama. It was first described by Carlos E. Valerio in 1982 as Metriopelma coloratum. It was transferred to the genus Hapalopus in 2016.

References

coloratus
Spiders of Central America
Spiders described in 1982